Crofton School is a coeducational foundation secondary school, located in Stubbington, Hampshire, England. The school has around 1200 students aged between 11 and 16 (years 7 to 11). The school accepts pupils from the areas of: Stubbington, Hill Head, Titchfield, Peel Common, Gosport and Locks Heath.

Crofton opened in 1974 as a purpose-built mixed comprehensive school. The headteacher is Simon Harrison who was appointed in January 2017. Crofton was awarded Specialist Science Status in 2005 but this has since been revoked.

Crofton has three 'feeder' schools: The Croft, Crofton Hammond Junior School and Crofton Anne Dale Junior School. Attendance at one of these feeder schools is a factor in admission to Crofton School.

As of 2022, the school's most recent judgement by Ofsted is Good, following a short inspection in 2018 which confirmed the previous judgement from a full inspection in 2014.

Key Staff 
School leadership team:

 Mr Simon Harrison-Headteacher
 Mrs G Badesha-Deputy headteacher
 Miss A Knight-Senior assistant headteacher
 Mr J Ainsworth-Assistant headteacher
 Mrs L Bryant-Assistant headteacher
 Mr J Hickey-Operations director

Head of Years-At the end of the school year, the Head of Years (HOY)s move up to the next year as well, to stay with their previous year.

 Head of Year 7-Mrs M Limburn
 Head of Year 8-Mr A Playford
 Head of Year 9-Mrs K Young & Mr M Allen
 Head of Year 10-Mr C Buckman
 Head of Year 11-Mr T Anderson

SSLs-Student Support Lead. At the end of the school year, the SSLs move up to the next year as well, to stay with their previous year.

 Year 7-Miss G Nightingale
 Year 8-Ms M Marshall
 Year 9-Mrs K Farrington
 Year 10-Mrs J Duff-Stewart
 Year 11-Ms S McGarrity

References

External links
Crofton School official website

Educational institutions established in 1974
Secondary schools in Hampshire
1974 establishments in England
Foundation schools in Hampshire